Floyd Taliaferro Alderson (November 13, 1895 – February 10, 1980) was an American film actor who specialized in westerns. After serving in the Great War, he began his career in the era of silent films, when he frequently used the name Wally Wales. 

Although he transitioned to sound, he was given smaller parts, and used the name Hal Taliaferro. He appeared in more than 220 films between 1921 and 1964. He lived his later years in Montana at his family ranch.

Biography
Born Floyd Taliaferro Alderson in 1895 in Sheridan, Wyoming, he was raised on his family's ranch, near Birney in Rosebud County, Montana.

Young Alderson's first "outside" job was on a cattle drive for rancher John B. Kendrick.  He also drove a tourist stage for the Buffalo Bill Stage line before drifting west in 1915. He settled in Los Angeles where he worked as a wrangler on Universal's ranch.

In 1917 during the Great War, Alderson joined the army and served in the American Expeditionary Forces in France. After his return to the US, he became involved in films as an actor. 

From 1921 through 1928 he appeared in twenty-two silent films (mainly Westerns), starring in many under the name Wally Wales. In 1929 he made the successful transition to sound, or "talkies".  But gradually his star faded, and he began appearing in much smaller roles, usually as Hal Taliaferro. 

He retired from films in the early 1950s and returned to his family ranch in Montana. It was then known as the Bones Brothers Ranch. He built a cabin there and lived out his remaining active years painting landscapes.

He died in a Sheridan, Wyoming nursing home from complications of a stroke and pneumonia in 1980, at age 84.  In 2004 the Bones Brothers Ranch was listed on the National Register of Historical Places (NRHP).

Filmography

References

External links

1895 births
1980 deaths
American male film actors
Male actors from Wyoming
People from Sheridan, Wyoming
Male Western (genre) film actors
Deaths from pneumonia in Wyoming
20th-century American male actors
United States Army soldiers
United States Army personnel of World War I
Military personnel from Wyoming